Njabulo Ricardo Mthembu (1970 – 8 July 2020) was a South African politician.

Career
He was a member of the African National Congress and a representative of the party in the KwaZulu-Natal Legislature from 2019 to 2020. Mthembu served on the legislature's Portfolio Committee on Co-operative Governance and Traditional Affairs.  Between 2011 and 2019, he served as the Executive Mayor of the KwaDukuza Local Municipality.

He was also the ANC provincial spokesperson and a member of both the party's Provincial Executive Committee and the Provincial Working Committee.

Mthembu died from COVID-19 during the COVID-19 pandemic in South Africa on 8 July 2020. He is survived by his wife, five daughters and a son.

References

External links
 Njabulo Ricardo Mthembu – People's Assembly

African National Congress politicians
Members of the KwaZulu-Natal Legislature
Zulu people
1970 births
2020 deaths
Deaths from the COVID-19 pandemic in South Africa